Buccan is a rural locality in the City of Logan, Queensland, Australia. In the  Buccan had a population of 1,818 people.

History
Early European settlers in Buccan were James Williamson and his brother-in-law Mr A. Fraser who selected land south of Bethania in about 1863. They attempted to grow cotton but had problems with bollworm. However, sugar cane was successfully grown in the district. One of the largest sugar cane plantations in the area was on the land which is Newstead Park today (beside the Logan River). Dairying was also an important farm industry.

Buccan railway station was on the disused Beaudesert railway line from Bethania to Beaudesert. The line opened on 21 September 1885.

Once part of the Shire of Beaudesert, Buccan became part of Logan City in the local government amalgamations of 2008.

In the 2011 census, Buccan had a population of 1,575 people.

In the  Buccan had a population of 1,818 people.

Geography

Buccan is a low density semi-rural suburb with larger acreage bushland type blocks. Buccan does not have a formalised town centre or shopping facilities with its residents relying on Logan Village, Waterford and Beenleigh to access such services.

Buccan is home to the Buccan Conservation Park, a nature conservation area managed by the Queensland Parks and Wildlife Service.

Waterford-Tamborine Road (State Route 95) runs through from north to south.

References

External links

 
 

Suburbs of Logan City
Localities in Queensland